"I Believe" is a song by French house group Galleon. It was released in November 2001 as the second single from their self-titled debut album. It sampled Europe's 1987 hit "Cherokee" in the beginning. "I Believe" was a moderate hit comparing to their debut single "So I Begin". The music video was shot to promote the single.

Formats and track listings
These are the formats and track listings of promotional single releases of "I Believe". 
CD single
"I Believe" Radio Edit - 3:57
"I Believe" Extended Mix - 5:50
"I Believe" Instrumental - 3:57

Chart performance

References

External links
"I Believe" on Discogs

2001 singles
2001 songs